Marqueston Devonte Huff (born April 6, 1992), also known by his nickname "Quest", is a former American football safety. He played college football at Wyoming and was drafted by the Tennessee Titans in the fourth round of the 2014 NFL Draft. He has also played for the Jacksonville Jaguars, Baltimore Ravens, Kansas City Chiefs, Dallas Cowboys, and Houston Roughnecks.

Early years 
Huff attended Liberty-Eylau High School. As a junior, he tallied 53 tackles, 2 interceptions, one forced fumble and 2 blocked field goals, while receiving All-district honors. 

As a senior, he registered 85 tackles, 3 interceptions, 3 forced fumbles, one fumble recovery and one blocked one punt. He received All-Northeast Texas and All-district honors. 

As a junior, he was named All-state in track and field as a sprinter and high jumper.

College career 
Huff accepted a football scholarship from the University of Wyoming. As a freshman, he played in all 12 games as a nickel back and on special teams. He made 18 tackles, one interception and one pass defensed.

As a sophomore, he was named a starter at cornerback. He registered 47 tackles (2.5 for loss), 3 interceptions (led the team), 2 passes defensed and 3 fumble recoveries. He had 2 fumble returns of 8 and 48 yards for touchdowns. 

As a junior, he posted 57 tackles (1.5 for loss), 7 passes defensed (second on the team), 2 forced fumbles, one fumble recovery and one blocked kick. He had 10 tackles against the University of Idaho.

As a senior, he was switched to free safety and was named a team-captain. He started all 12 games, collecting 127 tackles (third in the conference), 2 interceptions, one forced fumble, 2 fumbles recoveries and 6 passes defensed. He had 20 tackles against Utah State University, tying him for the third best single-game performance in school history. He had 18 tackles, one pass defensed and one forced fumble against the University of Nebraska.

Statistics

Professional career 
After completing four years at Wyoming, Huff decided to enter the NFL Draft.

Tennessee Titans
Huff was selected by the Tennessee Titans in the fourth round (122nd overall) of the 2014 NFL Draft. One of the reasons the Titans selected Huff is because he is versatile, and can play at either the safety position or at cornerback. In Week 14, Huff recorded his first interception against Eli Manning and the New York Giants, which he returned for a 23-yard touchdown. He appeared in 14 games, collecting 18 tackles, one sack, one interception (returned for a touchdown) and 2 passes defensed.

In 2015, he appeared in 16 games, making 15 tackles and 2 passes defensed On September 2, Huff was released by the Titans as part of final roster cuts.

Jacksonville Jaguars
The Jacksonville Jaguars claimed Huff off waivers on September 4, 2016. He was released by the team on September 13, 2016 and was signed to the team's practice squad the next day.

Baltimore Ravens
On October 6, 2016, Huff was signed by the Baltimore Ravens off of the Jaguars' practice squad. He appeared in 11 games as a backup.

Kansas City Chiefs
Huff signed with the Kansas City Chiefs on March 16, 2017. He was waived on July 6, 2017.

Tampa Bay Buccaneers
On July 30, 2017, Huff signed with the Tampa Bay Buccaneers. He was waived on September 2, 2017.

Dallas Cowboys
On January 10, 2018, Huff signed a reserve/future contract with the Dallas Cowboys. He was waived/injured on September 1, 2018 and was placed on injured reserve with a groin injury. On March 29, 2019, the Cowboys released Huff.

Houston Roughnecks
Huff was selected by the Houston Roughnecks in the fourth round during phase 4 in the 2020 XFL Draft. In March, amid the COVID-19 pandemic, the league announced that it would be cancelling the rest of the season. Playing in all 5 games, he registered 20 tackles and no interceptions. He had his contract terminated when the league suspended operations on April 10, 2020.

References

External links
 Wyoming Cowboys bio

1992 births
Living people
Sportspeople from Salinas, California
Players of American football from California
American football safeties
Wyoming Cowboys football players
Tennessee Titans players
Jacksonville Jaguars players
Baltimore Ravens players
Kansas City Chiefs players
Tampa Bay Buccaneers players
Dallas Cowboys players
Houston Roughnecks players